The 1968 Kilkenny Senior Hurling Championship was the 74th staging of the Kilkenny Senior Hurling Championship since its establishment by the Kilkenny County Board in 1887. The championship began on 9 June 1968 and ended on 27 April 1969.

Bennettsbridge were the defending champions.

On 27 April 1969, Rower-Inistioge won the championship after a 3–09 to 2–07 defeat of Bennettsbridge in the final at Nowlan Park. It was their first ever championship title. It remains their only championship triumph.

Rower-Inistioge's Eddie Keher was the championship's top scorer with 3-21.

Team changes

To Championship

Promoted from the Kilkenny Junior Hurling Championship
 Coon

Results

First round

Second round

Semi-finals

Final

Championship statistics

Top scorers

Top scorers overall

Top scorers in a single game

References

Kilkenny Senior Hurling Championship
Kilkenny Senior Hurling Championship